Macaca libyca is a prehistoric macaque from the Late Miocene of Wadi Natrun, Egypt.

References

M
Miocene primates of Africa
Taxa named by Ernst Stromer
Fossil taxa described in 1920